Crosseola striata is a species of small sea snail or micromollusc, a marine gastropod mollusc in the family Conradiidae.

Description
(Original description by R. Boog Watson) The height of the shell attains 1.5 mm, its diameter 1.3 mm. The very small, porcellaneous white shell has a turbinate shape. It is spirally striated, with a raised, subscalar spire, a minute rounded apex, which is tabulated, with the extreme tip just visible, a tumid body whorl, and a small strongly bordered umbilicus.

Sculpture: Longitudinals—there are microscopic lines of growth which gather into puckers below the suture.

Spirals—there are furrows broadish and square-cut, parted by flat raised surfaces of about twice their breadth. These extend to below the periphery, but not to the base, the most of which is smooth. Round the umbilicus is a high raised thread, which relatively to the size of the shell is enormous.

The four whorls are well rounded, and a very little tabulated below the suture. The body whorl is tumid. The suture is strongly marked, but hardly impressed. The aperture is round, but a little gibbous, bluntly pointed above. The thin, well arched outer lip is scarcely patulous. The inner lip is regularly curved from the corner of the aperture to the point of the columella, which is arched, with a thin inner edge parting the aperture from the umbilicus and joining the outer lip, while round the umbilicus twists the strong marginal cord which runs out into a strong
blunt tooth at the tip of the columella. The deep umbilicus is small but strongly marked.

Distribution
This marine species occurs off South Africa and Australia (Queensland, Northern Territory)

References

 Watson, R.B. 1883. Mollusca of "H.M.S. Challenger" expedition. Journal of the Linnean Society of London, Zoology 16: 494
 Thiele, J. 1925. Gastropoda der Deutschen Tiefsee-Expedition. II. Teil. Wissenschaftliche Ergebnisse der Deutschen Tiefsee-Expedition auf dem Dampfer "Valdivia" 1898–1899 17(2): 35-382, pls 313-346
 Cotton, B.C. 1959. South Australian Mollusca. Archaeogastropoda. Handbook of the Flora and Fauna of South Australia. Adelaide : South Australian Government Printer 449 pp.

striata
Gastropods described in 1883